Kevin Lewis may refer to:

Kevin C. Lewis, Jersey politician
Kevin Lewis (American football) (born 1978), American football linebacker
Kevin Lewis (cricketer) (1947–2020), Australian cricketer
Kevin Lewis (footballer, born 1940), English footballer who played for Huddersfield Town, Liverpool and Sheffield United
Kevin Lewis (footballer, born 1952), English footballer who played for Crewe Alexandra and Stoke City
Kevin Lewis (footballer, born 1970), English footballer who played for Stoke City
Kevin Lewis (footballer, born 1999), Uruguayan footballer